Tiger Force was a U.S. Army unit that fought in the Vietnam War.

Tiger Force may also refer to:
 Tiger Force (air), or the Very Long Range Bomber Force, an air force unit of the British Commonwealth
 Tiger Forces, a special forces unit of the Syrian Arab Army
 All Tripura Tiger Force, an isolationist group in India
 Bhutan Tiger Force, the armed wing of the Bhutan Communist Party (Marxist–Leninist–Maoist)
 Tiger Faction New Forces, a South Sudanese rebel group

See also
 Tigers Militia
 Tamil Tigers
 Tiger (disambiguation)#Military